The RD-0255 is a propulsion module composed of an RD-0256 main engine and a RD-0257 vernier engine. Both are liquid rocket engine, burning UDMH in N2O4. The RD-0256 main engine operates in the oxidizer rich staged combustion cycle, while the vernier RD-0257 uses the simpler gas generator cycle. It was used on the R-36MUTTKh (GRAU:15A18) and R-36M2 (GRAU:15A18M). Subsequently, it has been in the Dnepr second stage and as of 2016 it is still in active service.

The RD-0256 is an improved version of the RD-0228 (GRAU: 15D84), itself composed of an RD-0229 (GRAU: 15D84) main engine and a RD-0230 (GRAU: 15D79) vernier engine. The RD-0228 was developed between 1967 and 1974 for the first generation of R-36M (GRAU: 15D83) ICBM second stage, but was replaced on subsequent iterations by the RD-0256. The RD-0228 debut was on January 21, 1973. With the START I and START II the RD-0228 was retired and its successor, the RD-0256, only continued as the Dnepr.

See also

 R-36M – A Soviet ICBM that used the RD-0228 and RD-0255.
 Dnepr – Small launch vehicle designed by Yuzhmash that uses the RD-0255.
 KBKhA – The RD-0228 and RD-0255 design bureau.
 Vernier Engine
 Rocket engine

References

External links 
 KbKhA official information on the engine. (Archived)
 Encyclopedia Astronautica information on the propulsion module. (Archived)

Rocket engines of the Soviet Union
Rocket engines using hypergolic propellant